Alfred Claude Aimé Girard (22 December 1831 – 12 April 1898) was a French chemist and agronomist who was a professor at the Conservatoire des Arts et Métiers.

Biography 

He was a member of the Académie d'Agriculture, the Académie des sciences (1894-1898) and the Comité des travaux historiques et scientifiques (1897-1898, resident member).

He wrote many publications throughout his lifetime on various topics from the fabrication of paper to the cultivation of industrial potatoes. (All published between 1861-1898)

He was a member of the board of directors of the Société française de photographie in 1863 and had been a member of that society from 1855.

He died at 67 years old and was buried in the renowned Père Lachaise cemetery.

Selected writings 
 Recherches sur la composition des raisins des principaux cépages de France, 1895 (Research on grape composition involving the principal grapes of France).
 Mémoire sur l'hydro-cellulose et ses dérivés, 1881 (Memoirs on hydro-cellulose and its derivatives).
 Recherches sur la culture de la pomme de terre industrielle, 1889 ( Research on the cultivation of industrial potatoes.)
 Introduction au Dictionnaire de chimie industrielle, 1861 (Introduction to the dictionary of industrial chemistry).
 Papier et papeterie, 1873 (Paper and stationery).
 Composition chimique et valeur alimentaire des diverses parties du grain de froment, 1884 (Chemical composition and nutritive value involving different parts of wheat grain).
 Recherches sur le développement progressif de la grappe de raisin, 1898. (Research on the gradual development of the grape cluster.)

References

External links
 
 The Works of Aimé Girard (French)
 France savante (biographical and bibliographical information)

19th-century French chemists
1830 births
1898 deaths
French agronomists
Burials at Père Lachaise Cemetery